At the 1994 Gay Games held in New York City, an all-transsexual netball team from Indonesia competed. This team had been the Indonesian national champions.

References

Bibliography

External links 
Olympic Council of Asia